Bernard Ballet (January 1941 – 17 February 2022) was a French actor and director.

Biography
Ballet was born in Lyon in January 1941 to a large family. Seeking to become an architect, he attended the École nationale supérieure des beaux-arts de Lyon, but he was expelled from the school. His first play was directed by Marcel Maréchal, who offered him an understudy role in "Compagnie du Cothurne".

From 1962 to the 1980s, Ballet appeared exclusively in plays directed by Maréchal. He also took part in cinema, appearing in dozens of films.

Ballet died on 17 February 2022, at the age of 81.

Filmography

Cinema
Uranus (1990)
 (1991)
 (1991)
 (1992)
 (1992)
 (1992)
The Birth of Love (1993)
 (1994)
 (1995)
 (1999)
 (1999)
 (2001)
 (2001)
 (2002)
Adolphe (2002)
 (2006)

Short films
À table (1992)

References

1941 births
2022 deaths
French male actors
French male television actors
French male film actors
French male stage actors
People from Lyon